Dustin Ford (born June 11, 1978) is the associate head men's basketball coach at the University of Akron.  Prior to joining the Zips staff, he served as assistant coach at the University of Illinois, Ohio University and at Western Carolina University. Ford's older brother Geno Ford is currently the head coach at Stony Brook in Stony Brook, New York and his father Gene Ford was a longtime high school head coach in Ohio and the head coach at NCAA Division III Muskingum University in New Concord, Ohio. His nephew, Darin, is an assistant coach at Pratt Community College in Kansas.

Playing career
After graduating from Cambridge High School in Cambridge, Ohio, Ford attended Ohio University in Athens, Ohio where he earned his Bachelor of Science degree in communication studies in 2001.

At Ohio, Ford was a four-year letter winner as a point guard for the Bobcats under head coach Larry Hunter. During his junior and senior seasons, Ford led the Bobcats in 3-point field goals.

Coaching career
Ford first served as a college assistant for 3 years at Western Carolina University for his former head coach at Ohio, Larry Hunter. While on staff for the Catamounts, Ford recruited two future Southern Conference Defensive Players of the year in Brigham Waginger (2010) and Richie Gordon (2011). Waginger is currently an assistant coach at Western Carolina and Gordon is playing professionally in France.

In 2009, Ford returned to Ohio to join coach John Groce as an assistant. During his time at Ohio, he helped the Bobcats win two Mid-American Conference men's basketball tournament championships. In 2010 and 2012 Ohio went into the NCAA Division I men's basketball tournament, culminating with a Sweet-Sixteen appearance against North Carolina.

When coach Groce accepted the head coach position at the University of Illinois in 2012, Ford went with him as an assistant coach. Ford helped the Fighting Illini win the 2012 Maui Invitational Tournament, win a 2013 NCAA Division I men's basketball tournament game against Colorado, and post a 23 win season in his first season at Illinois. The following season, Illinois made an appearance in the 2014 National Invitation Tournament.

References

External links
 College Basketball Statistics
 Illinois profile
 Western Carolina profile
 Ohio profile

1978 births
Living people
Akron Zips men's basketball coaches
American men's basketball coaches
Basketball players from Ohio
High school basketball coaches in the United States
Illinois Fighting Illini men's basketball coaches
Ohio Bobcats men's basketball coaches
Ohio Bobcats men's basketball players
People from Cambridge, Ohio
Western Carolina Catamounts men's basketball coaches
American men's basketball players
Basketball coaches from Ohio
Point guards